The Separate Representation of Voters Amendment Act, 1968 (Act No. 50 of 1968) was an act of the Parliament of South Africa enacted under the government of B. J. Vorster, which repealed the Separate Representation of Voters Act, 1951. This had the effect of removing the four members of the House of Assembly who were elected by Coloured voters in the Cape Province as well as abolishing the additional nominated seat in the Senate for the "non-European" (i.e. Coloured, as black Africans were explicitly excluded from the definition under section 1 (ii) of the 1951 act) population of the Cape Province, that had only been filled once in 1957 and had been vacant since 1962. Subsequently the House of Assembly would be elected solely by white voters.

The act was promulgated on 5 June 1968, but the repeal only took effect at the dissolution of the House of Assembly on 2 March 1970, before the general election of 22 April 1970. In the interim, the term of office of the four members was extended and the filling of any vacancy in their seats (or the vacancy of the additional Senate seat for the Coloured population of the Cape Province) was prohibited.

In 1969 Coloured citizens were given the right to elect members to the Coloured Persons Representative Council, a quasi-legislative body with limited powers.

The act was repealed by the Constitution of 1983, which created the House of Representatives to represent Coloured citizens in Parliament.

Apartheid laws in South Africa
Election legislation
1968 in South African law